Henry Strete (by 1481 – 1535/36) was an English politician.

He was a Member (MP) of the Parliament of England for Plymouth in 1510.

References

15th-century births
1536 deaths
Members of the Parliament of England for Plymouth
English MPs 1510